Homalium foetidum is a species of plant in the family Salicaceae. It is found in Indonesia, Malaysia, Papua New Guinea, and the Philippines.

References

foetidum
Least concern plants
Taxonomy articles created by Polbot